Buonaventura Ligli, known in Spain as Ventura Lirios (Verona 1688 - Zamora 1732) was an Italian painter, active in Naples and Madrid.  He was a pupil of Luca Giordano in Naples, and went to Spain, where he was called Lirios.  By 1682 he was living at Madrid, where there is a picture of the Battle of Almansa painted by him.

References

17th-century Italian painters
Italian male painters
18th-century Italian painters
17th-century Spanish painters
Spanish male painters
18th-century Spanish painters
18th-century Spanish male artists
Italian Baroque painters
Spanish Baroque painters
Painters from Naples
Italian battle painters
1688 births
1732 deaths
18th-century Italian male artists